Henri Jozef Machiel Nouwen (January 24, 1932 – September 21, 1996) was a Dutch Catholic priest, professor, writer and theologian. His interests were rooted primarily in psychology, pastoral ministry, spirituality, social justice and community. Over the course of his life, Nouwen was heavily influenced by the work of Anton Boisen, Thomas Merton, Rembrandt, Vincent van Gogh, and Jean Vanier.

After nearly two decades of teaching at academic institutions including the University of Notre Dame, Yale Divinity School and Harvard Divinity School, Nouwen went on to work with individuals with intellectual and developmental disabilities at the L'Arche Daybreak community in Richmond Hill, Ontario.

Biography

Early life

Henri Nouwen was born in Nijkerk, the Netherlands on January 24, 1932. He was the oldest of four children born to Laurent J. M. Nouwen and Maria Nouwen (née Ramselaar). Nouwen's father was a tax lawyer and his mother worked as a bookkeeper for her family's business in Amersfoort.
Nouwen studied at the Jesuit Aloysius College in The Hague before spending a year at the minor seminary in Apeldoorn. His year at the school was spent preparing for six years of study for the priesthood, consisting of training in philosophy and theology, at the major seminary in Rijsenburg.

Priesthood
Nouwen was ordained a Catholic priest for the Archdiocese of Utrecht on July 21, 1957, by Bernardus Alfrink at St. Catherine's Cathedral in Utrecht. Eager to learn more about himself and the people he counseled, Nouwen requested permission from Alfrink to study psychology instead of theology. His request was granted and from 1957 to 1964 he studied at the Catholic University of Nijmegen. In studying the fundamentals of clinical psychology, Nouwen struggled with the lack of interdisciplinary analysis. He sought to use psychology as a means of exploring the human side of faith which he felt was being overlooked, from a pastoral standpoint, in broader theological discussions. During his studies at the university, he was greatly influenced by Han Fortmann, a Dutch psychologist of religion whose writing about action and contemplation in a busy world are mirrored in Nouwen's own work. For his thesis work, Nouwen focused on Anton Boisen, an American minister credited with founding the clinical pastoral education movement. The thesis was not approved due to a lack of scientific analysis and clinical study. Rather than revising the work to obtain a doctorate, Nouwen completed his studies in 1964 by obtaining a doctorandus degree.

After receiving his doctorandus, Nouwen studied for two years as a Fellow in the Religion and Psychiatry Program at the Menninger Clinic in Topeka, Kansas, and was influenced by psychologist Gordon Allport. Nouwen completed his clinical pastoral training at the Topeka State Hospital and graduated from the Menninger Foundation's training program in theology and psychiatric theory on June 19, 1965. During his time at the Clinic he found he preferred direct contact with patients over the more scientific and medical analysis of certain branches of psychology. This prompted an examination of his professional practice in order to better integrate spiritual ministry with modern psychology. Over the course of this same period, Nouwen began to engage with social and political happenings, including the Civil Rights Movement. In 1965 he traveled to the Southern United States to participate in, and later publish an article about, the Selma to Montgomery marches.

From 1966 to 1968 he was a visiting professor at the University of Notre Dame. From 1968 to 1970 he worked at the Amsterdam Joint Pastoral Institute and taught psychology and spirituality at the Catholic Theological University of Utrecht. In 1971 he received his doctorandus degree in theology.

Between 1971 and 1981 Nouwen was a professor of pastoral theology at Yale Divinity School, where he began to establish a broad readership of his work as a contributor to various publications including the National Catholic Reporter and as the author of several books based on personal experience. During his time at Yale, Nouwen  took several sabbaticals, some of which informed his writing. In 1976 he was a Fellow at the Collegeville Institute for Ecumenical and Cultural Research at Saint John's Abbey, Collegeville, Minnesota, and in 1978 he was scholar-in-residence at the Pontifical North American College in Rome.

While a professor at Yale Nouwen also spent several months at the Abbey of the Genesee. His first visit began on June 1, 1974, and lasted seven months. While there he kept a journal that was published as Genesee Diary: Report from a Trappist Monastery in 1976. He returned again in 1979, after the death of his mother, which led to the publication of A Cry For Mercy: Prayers from the Genesee. Though Nouwen concluded he was not suited for the trappist life, the Abbey of the Genesee and his relationship with then abbott John Eudes Bamberger continued to be of great importance to him. The Abbey served as his home base for more than a year after he resigned from Yale and it was where he chose to celebrate the 25th anniversary of his ordination as a priest on August 6, 1982.

After leaving Yale in 1981, Nouwen took a six-month trip to South America visiting Bolivia and Peru. Upon his return to the United States in 1983, Nouwen was appointed at the Harvard Divinity School as Professor of Divinity and Horace De Y. Lentz Lecturer. The half-time appointment allowed Nouwen to split his time between teaching at the Divinity School and working with a theological center in Latin America. Nouwen taught at the school until his resignation in 1985. In 1985 and 1986 he spent nine months with the L'Arche community in France.

L'Arche

Nouwen's spirituality was greatly influenced by his friendship with Jean Vanier. The two men met while Nouwen was teaching at Harvard. Vanier sensed how lost Nouwen was feeling and invited him to visit Trosly-Breuil. Nouwen visited Vanier at the French community, the first in the L'Arche network, twice before returning in 1985 for a nine-month residency. The stay helped Nouwen find a purpose that had been missing. As Robert A. Jonas explains: "Henri had always wondered what a Eucharistically centered community would be like, and now he had found one at L'Arche." 

During Nouwen's time in France he traveled to Toronto, Ontario, to officiate at a wedding and sought permission to stay for a week at L'Arche Daybreak in Richmond Hill. While there a core member named Raymond was hit by a car and left in critical condition. Nouwen provided spiritual guidance to the community and Raymond’s family, ultimately helping to reconcile the community and the family, who partially blamed Daybreak for Raymond's injuries. Nouwen's intervention had such an impact that the Daybreak members asked him to serve as their pastor. Nouwen accepted and moved in the fall of 1986 to L'Arche Daybreak, where he would spend the last ten years of his life.

While at Daybreak Nouwen was paired with Adam Arnett, a core member at L'Arche Daybreak with profound developmental disabilities."It is I, not Adam, who gets the main benefit from our friendship," Nouwen insisted. Nouwen wrote about his relationship with Arnett in a book entitled Adam: God's Beloved.

Sexuality

Nouwen struggled with his sexuality, which may have contributed to his feelings of self-doubt. Although this struggle was known by those close to him, Nouwen never publicly identified as homosexual despite acknowledging the matter in discussions with friends and alluding to a personal struggle in his private journals. In his book The Return of the Prodigal Son, Nouwen describes a friendship that had him under a spell, did him no good and when it finally collapsed left him in a depressive mood and in search of self-esteem and acceptance by others. Biographer Michael Ford referenced these instances in the biography Wounded Prophet, which was published after Nouwen's death. Ford suggests that Nouwen only became fully comfortable with his sexual orientation in the last few years of his life, and that Nouwen's depression was caused, in part, by the conflict between his priestly vows of chastity and the sense of loneliness and longing for intimacy that he experienced. "This took an enormous emotional, spiritual and physical toll on his life and may have contributed to his early death." While his struggle to reconcile his priestly vows of chastity with his human desire for physical and emotional intimacy appears in his writings, there is no evidence that Nouwen ever broke his vow of celibacy.

Death and legacy
Nouwen died in the Netherlands on September 21, 1996, from a sudden heart attack, while en route to Russia to participate in a Dutch documentary about his book The Return of the Prodigal Son. Nouwen's first funeral Mass was held on September 24 at St. Catherine's Cathedral in Utrecht with a eulogy offered by Jean Vanier, after which Nouwen's body was flown to Canada for burial by the L'Arche Daybreak community. The second funeral Mass was held on September 28 at the Slovak Catholic Cathedral of the Transfiguration in Markham, Ontario, following a full-day wake at St. Mary Immaculate Catholic Church in Richmond Hill on September 27. Nouwen was laid to rest in a pine coffin built in L'Arche Daybreak's The Woodery and colourfully painted by members of the community. He is buried in St. John's Anglican Church Cemetery in Richmond Hill in keeping with his desire to be near the graves of other Daybreak community members. There is also a memorial marker for Nouwen in Geysteren, NL at the grave site of his parents.

Prior to his death he entrusted Sue Mosteller with his estate, making her the literary executrix of his works. The founding of the Henri J.M. Nouwen Archives and Research Collection at the John M. Kelly Library, University of St. Michael's College, was the culmination of Mosteller's effort to centralize Nouwen's personal records. The work involved organizing his material at L'Arche Daybreak, which included personal correspondence, original manuscripts, and audio visual material, and negotiating with the Yale Divinity School Library for the release of records Nouwen had begun depositing there as a faculty member in 1975. The Nouwen Archives opened in September 2000.

He has an award named for him, the Henri Nouwen Leadership Award, given out by the American Association on Intellectual and Developmental Disabilities, Religion and Spirituality Division.
There is an endowed lectureship in Classical Christian Spirituality named after him at Drew University. 
There is also an elementary school named after him in Richmond Hill, Ontario.

Writing 

Before his death Nouwen published 39 books and authored hundreds of articles.  His books have sold over 7 million copies worldwide and have been published in more than 30 languages. In a magazine survey conducted by Christian Century in 2003 Nouwen's work was indicated as a first choice of authors for Catholic and mainline Protestant clergy. His books include The Wounded Healer, In the Name of Jesus, Clowning in Rome, The Life of the Beloved and The Way of the Heart, along with what is recognized as one of his most popular books, The Return of the Prodigal Son.

While visiting the L'Arche Trosly-Breuil community in France, he saw a poster of Rembrandt's painting The Return of the Prodigal Son that made a deep impression on him. He decided to see the painting personally and traveled to Saint Petersburg (Leningrad at that time) to visit the Hermitage Museum where it is kept. This resulted in a several-day contemplation of the painting, which prompted him to write a book of the same name. The Return of the Prodigal Son was ranked number 66 on a list of 100 best Christian books compiled by the Church Times in 2014.

Themes
Nouwen was known to suffer from loneliness and a need for interpersonal connection, which he wrote about openly. His popularity as a spiritual guide has been linked to his capacity to describe his personal struggles in a relatable manner. He credited his approach to an interest in the daily life of people and his own journey with Christian life:

One of Nouwen's major ongoing themes involved his struggle reconciling his depression with his Christian faith. His most famous work on this topic is the Inner Voice of Love, his diary from December 1987 to June 1988 during one of his most serious bouts with clinical depression. Nouwen also explored this theme in Return of the Prodigal Son, describing love and forgiveness as unconditional. In the book, he invites the reader to follow him in his personal return to the spiritual fountains and in a parallel meditation on all the characters of the parable, their rendering by Rembrandt, and the painter's personal life.

Nouwen also wrote several essays on the necessity of peacemaking. He used God's Love as a justification for the preservation of life, as well as for his opposition to both the ongoing Cold War and the intervention of the United States in Vietnam. This was of a piece with his conviction of the oneness of all peoples under God:

Public speaking
Nouwen was a frequent public speaker. In addition to his teaching responsibilities, he traveled extensively leading retreats and preaching. With a distinct accent and animated speaking style, Nouwen was known for his engaging and expressive style of communication. The experience of seeing him preach has been compared to being at the theater or seeing a musical conductor at work. It was not uncommon for Nouwen to enthusiastically jump around or wave his arms and hands during speaking events and classroom lectures. Bob Massie describes the experience of watching Nouwen speak in Befriending Life (2001): "His squeezing, tugging gestures made it look like he was striving to milk meaning directly out of the air. He would point his fingers down and rotate his wrists as though trying to stir a separate little pot with each digit."

Nouwen appealed to many audiences, including Anglicans and evangelicals because of his Jesus-centered spirituality. In 1992 he was invited by Robert H. Schuller to preach on Hour of Power at the Crystal Cathedral in Garden Grove, California. Nouwen appeared over three consecutive Sundays and preached on the topic of belovedness. Recordings of his appearance were later used by Schuller as a model for preaching when instructing new ministers.

Prizes
Christopher Award (1984) for Gracias!
Thomas Merton Award (1985)
Ronald McDonald House Charities Award of Excellence (1996)
Emmausprisen (2002)

Bibliography

Works about Nouwen

Books

Articles and essays

See also 
 Frederick Buechner
 C. S. Lewis

References

External links

 
Henri Nouwen fonds at University of Toronto Archives
Henri J.M. Nouwen Archives & Research Collection - includes audiovisual material; digital requests enabled
Henri Nouwen Society
 L'Arche Daybreak
爱中契合(亨利卢云著)

1932 births
1996 deaths
People from Nijkerk
Canadian Roman Catholic theologians
Dutch non-fiction writers
University of Notre Dame faculty
Harvard University faculty
Yale University faculty
Roman Catholic writers
Dutch Christian pacifists
Roman Catholic mystics
20th-century Dutch Roman Catholic theologians
20th-century Christian mystics
20th-century Dutch Roman Catholic priests
Canadian Christian mystics
20th-century non-fiction writers
Catholic spirituality